Heyd is a surname. Notable people with this surname include:

 Charles Bernhard Heyd (1842–1929), Canadian politician
 Charles G. Heyd (1884–1970), American surgeon
 Christian Heyd (born 1878), Swiss football player
 Matthew Heyd, American Episcopal priest

See also
 Heyde